The undissected stratovolcano of Amukta volcano makes up most of nearly circular, 7.7-km-wide Amukta Island (Amuux̂tax̂ in Aleut). It is the westernmost of the Islands of Four Mountains chain. The cone, about 5.8 km in basal diameter and topped by a 0.4 km wide summit crater, appears on synthetic-aperture radar imagery to be built upon a 300+ meter high, east-west trending arcuate ridge. Extensions of that ridge on the southwest and east sides of the island indicate an older caldera approximately 6 km in diameter and open to the sea on the south side. No hot springs or fumaroles have been reported from Amukta. Sekora (1973, p. 29) reports the presence of a cinder cone near the northeastern shore of the island.

Volcanic activity
Well documented reports of historical Amukta volcanism are sparse; activity was noted from 1786 to 1791, and again in 1876 (Coats, 1950). Petroff (1884, citing Grewingk, 1850) lists activity at Amukhton in 1770, presumably the same volcano; conversely, Dall (1870, citing Grewingk, 1850) describes a cessation of activity at Amukta in 1770. On February 13, 1963 an eruption occurred involving the central crater and one or more parasitic vents; both ash and lava were produced (Anchorage Times, February 11, 1963; Decker, 1967). Persistent low clouds obscured the exact source of the lava, but the flow was seen to extend from the west side of the cone southwest into the sea at Traders Cove (Bulletin of Volcanic Eruptions, 1963).

In late August and early September, 1987, a commercial pilot observed a 10.5 km high eruption plume rising through cloud cover near Amukta Island. On September 4, another pilot observed a small dark ash plume issuing from the summit of Amukta (Smithsonian Institution, 1987). On Sept. 18, yet another pilot reported a 300m-high ash plume.

In early July 1996, a passing ship reported a 1-km high plume of "ash and smoke" (Neal and McGimsey, 1997). On August 28 Mt. Cleveland, 100 km to the northeast, was also active and winds were blowing towards Amukta.

Composition
Igneous rocks produced by this volcano range from granite to monzonite, however the most common rock found in/around Mt. Amukta is basalt.

See also

List of volcanoes in the United States of America

Sources

Catalog of the Historically Active Volcanoes of Alaska
by T.P. Miller, R.G. McGimsey, D.H. Richter, J.R. Riehle, C.J. Nye, M.E. Yount, and J.A. Dumoulin. U.S. GEOLOGICAL SURVEY Open-File Report 98-582, 104 pages, 102 figures. Alaska Volcano Observatory, Alaska, 1998.
Petroff, Ivan, 1884, The volcanic region of Alaska: in Population, Industries, and Resources of Alaska, Washington DC, Government Printing Office, p. 93-96.
Coats, R. R., 1963, Aleutian Islands and Alaska: Bulletin of Volcanic Eruptions, v. 3, p. 3.
Dall, W. H., 1870, Alaska and its resources: Boston, Lee and Shepard, 627 p.
Neal, Christina, and McGimsey, R. G., 1997, 1996 volcanic activity in Alaska and Kamchatka: Summary of events and response of the Alaska Volcano Observatory: U.S. Geological Survey Open-File Report OF 97-0433, 34 p.
 
 Alaska Volcano Observatory

Stratovolcanoes of the United States
Active volcanoes
Mountains of Alaska
Volcanoes of Alaska
Volcanoes of the Aleutian Islands
Landforms of Aleutians West Census Area, Alaska
Aleutian Range
Calderas of Alaska
Mountains of Unorganized Borough, Alaska
Volcanoes of Unorganized Borough, Alaska